Catasauqua High School is a public high school serving grades 9 through 12 in Northampton, Pennsylvania in the Lehigh Valley region of eastern Pennsylvania. 
As of 2021-22, the school had 498 students, according to National Center for Education Statistics data.

Catasauqua High School is the only high school in the Catasauqua Area School District.  The school district also includes Catasauqua Middle School, which serves grades 5 through 8, and Francis H. Sheckler Elementary School, which serves kindergarten through grade 4.

Although Catasauqua High School is part of the Catasauqua Area School District and serves the residents of Catasauqua, Pennsylvania, the school building is physically located in the city and county of Northampton. The previous high school building, situated in Catasauqua proper, is now the middle school building. The previous middle school building, which was in fact the original high school building, is currently home to the Innovative Arts Academy.

The school's mascot is the Rough Rider and its school colors are brown and white with gold sometimes used as an accentuating third color.

Athletics

The Catasauqua High School mascot is the Rough Rider and the athletic teams are colloquially referred to as the “Roughies.”  The school colors are brown and white, with gold sometimes used as an accentuating third color.  Catasauqua High School participates in the Class AA division of PIAA District XI and in the Colonial League for sports.  The school fields teams in each of the following sports listed below.

Fall sports
Football
Field hockey
Boys' soccer
Boys' cross country
Girls' cross country
Girls' volleyball
Girls' soccer
Winters sports
Boys' basketball
Girls' basketball
Wrestling
Spring sports
Baseball
Softball
Boys' track and field
Girls' track and field

The Catasauqua High School Sports Hall of Fame, a body which honors past Catasauqua High School athletes who have distinguished themselves in the local community and beyond, was created in 2004 and inducted its first members that year.  A shrine in the high school's gymnasium houses a plaque/picture in recognition of each athlete inducted.  The list includes such noteworthy athletes as Larry Miller, Pat Kelly, and Jon Linton.  Beginning in 2005, the body also now awards an annual scholarship to college-bound recipients for athletic accomplishments achieved.

List of PIAA state championships

Baseball
1997

Football
The school's football team competes in the Class AA division of PIAA District XI and in the Colonial League in the Lehigh Valley region of eastern Pennsylvania. The team plays its home games at Alumni Field in Catasauqua. In 2008, the program celebrated its 100th season of competition. In 2013 the Catasauqua – Northampton game played its game on a neutral site (at Muhlenberg College).

List of football championships
 Lehigh Valley League
 1927, 1928, 1929, 1930, 1931, 1932, 1933, 1934, 1936, 1941, 1943, 1944
 Colonial League
 1975, 1976, 1981, 1982, 1983, 1986, 1991, 1992, 1994, 1995, 1996, 2012, 2013
 District XI
 1984, 1990, 1991, 1992, 2013
 Eastern Conference
 1996, 1997, 2002

Thanksgiving Day rivalry
On each Thanksgiving Day, the Catasauqua Rough Riders play a non-league game against their rival, the Northampton Konkrete Kids.  The game is not sanctioned and does not count as a win or loss for official standings with regard to playoff consideration within the PIAA.  The game is always considered to be Homecoming for Catasauqua, regardless of whether the game is played at home or away. These two high schools from neighboring towns first played each other in 1925 and the game ended in a controversial victory for Catasauqua. A rematch was challenged by Northampton and scheduled for Thanksgiving Day to decide the outcome as that was the only available day on the calendar. Catasauqua won both games the first year. In 1926, once again the two schools met and again the game ended in a controversial victory, this time for Northampton. Catasauqua challenged a rematch and once again they met on Thanksgiving Day to decide the outcome. Northampton won both games the second year. Beginning in 1927, the game was agreed to be played on Thanksgiving Day from the onset of the season. A tradition was born and the game has been played every year since. Both schools and their respective communities have developed a bitter rivalry toward each other. For a number of years through 1968, the Catasauqua – Northamption game was played on a neutral site (at Muhlenberg College). Beginning in 1969, the games were held alternately at the teams' home fields until 2013, when the game was again played at Muhlenberg. In the most recent game, in 2018, Northampton beat Catasauqua.

Girls' basketball
1988

Student media
Newspaper: The Brown & White
Literary/Art Magazine: The Drum
Yearbook: Brunalba

Notable alumni
Mike Bundra, former professional football player, Cleveland Browns, Detroit Lions, Minnesota Vikings, and New York Giants
Pat Kelly, former professional baseball player, New York Yankees, St. Louis Cardinals, and Toronto Blue Jays
Jon Linton, former professional football player, Buffalo Bills
Thomas J. Lynch, former Army Air Forces lieutenant colonel, flying ace of World War II, and Distinguished Service Cross recipient
Ruth McVey, co-author, Cornell Paper
Larry Miller, former professional ABA basketball player, Carolina Cougars, Los Angeles Stars, San Diego Conquistadors, Utah Stars, and Virginia Squires
Anthony Recker, former professional baseball player, Arizona Diamondbacks, Atlanta Braves, New York Mets, and Oakland Athletics

Notable faculty
Ben Wolfson, former head football coach, Lafayette College and Moravian College

References

External links
Official website
Catasauqua High School athletics official website
Catasauqua High School on Facebook
Catasauqua High School on Twitter
Catasauqua High School athletics on Twitter
Catasauqua High School sports coverage at The Express-Times

1868 establishments in Pennsylvania
Educational institutions established in 1868
Public high schools in Pennsylvania
Schools in Northampton County, Pennsylvania